Chester Bus Interchange is a bus station in Chester, England. It is situated at the Hoole Way roundabout.

History 
The bus station was constructed to replace Princess Street bus station.

Work began in September 2015. The bus station was expected to open in early 2017, but was delayed. The first buses entered the facility during a test on 27 March 2017. The first passenger service to use the bus was Chester's park and ride service on 30 May 2017, and most other services began using the station on 5 June. A bus service, named Shopper Hopper, was introduced to link the current bus station to the site of the former Princess Street bus station.

Facilities 
The bus station has 13 stances, and is designed to handle 156 buses per hour. It was designed by Jefferson Sheard Architects. It has been noted for its exceptional accessibility. Features include a Changing Places toilet, a tactile map endorsed by the Royal National Institute of Blind People, and a dual-height customer service desk.

References 

Bus stations in England
Buildings and structures in Chester